El Hamam is the easternmost city in the Matrouh Governorate, Egypt, located on the Mediterranean coast close to the border with the Alexandria Governorate.

The ancient town Cheimo was located in city's vicinity.

References 

Populated places in Matrouh Governorate